Zarautz is a coastal town located in central Gipuzkoa, Basque Country, in Spain. It has four enclaves limiting the aforementioned municipalities: Alkortiaga, Ekano, Sola, and Arbestain. , Zarautz has a population of 22,890, which usually swells to about 60,000 in the summer.

The beach is known for being the longest in the Basque Country and one of longest of the Cantabrian cornice.

The Mayor of Zarautz since 2015 has been Xabier Txurruka (Basque Nationalist Party).

History
1237: The site is founded as a town and its Navarrese charters confirmed by king Fernando III of Castile.
1857: The beginning of the Industrial Revolution in Zarautz, thanks to the enterprise "Fabril Linera". An era of economic growth and development begins.
1936: The Civil War begins and Zarautz overwhelmingly supports the Republican cause.
1936: The province falls to Falangist forces in the Spanish Civil War, who carry out reprisals against the Basque nationalists.

At the end of the 19th century, and the beginning of the 20th century, the popularity of Zarautz as a luxury tourist destination grew, and many well-known people began to holiday there. A number of lavish houses and mansions sprang up, particularly along the beach. Nowadays, many of these buildings have become public buildings or have been demolished and replaced by chic apartment buildings.

During the 1970s and 1980s, Zarautz became a more affordable destination, and is now perhaps best known for its surfing and water sports.

Infrastructure and transport

Road
Zarautz is connected to the European road network and to the rest of Spain by the A8 motorway.

Gastronomy
As it is tradition in the Basque Country, gastronomy is a very important part of Zarautz. Many restaurants can be found in Zarautz, offering traditional as well as modern fine cuisine. Zarautz is home town of one of the most famous cooks in Spain, Karlos Arguiñano, whose hotel and restaurant can be found right in front of the beach. He also created a prestigious cooking school called Aiala.
As in all cities around The Basque Country, there are a lot of gastronomical societies in Zarautz. They are very traditional and called Txoko in Basque.

Public transport
Zarautz has two railway stations, and trains (Euskotren Trena) connect it with San Sebastian and Bilbao.

Zarautz has two bus lines operating within the town.

Museums
There are two museums in Zarautz, the Photomuseum and the Art and History Museum of Zarautz. In "Dorre Luzea" there are frequent art exhibitions. The town also has many other picture galleries.

Churches
There are three main churches in Zarautz and many other smaller churches. Santa Maria la Real is the main church, with a very interesting altar piece and a Romanesque structure. Santa Clara is also quite interesting, built in a baroque style. Finally, Franciscanos church, which has been virtually rebuilt, features a very interesting library.

Recreation

Zarautz has first class sporting facilities, such as an old and elegant Golf Club. But Zarautz is renowned worldwide as a surfing destination. Over the last few years, it has become incredibly popular among surfers, and even a number of surfing schools have been established (Zarautz, Pukas).

Sport
Zarautz is the birthplace of the Basque Weightlifting Federation as well as the Gipuzkoa Weightlifting Federation. Since 1968 weightlifting (ZKEhalterofilia) has been one of the sports that can be practiced at the local sports club (Zarautz Kirol Elkartea). Since then, every summer an international weightlifting event has taken place in the town. At first, very famous athletes took part in that competition such as Serge Reding and Alain Terme to name a few. In recent times, the event has become a club competition in which the French champion Girondins de Bordeaux has won most of the top prizes.

The town is also famous as one of Spain's most popular surfing spots. Its 2.5 km beach offers highly consistent surfing with many different peaks for all standards of surfers. The town is a great place to learn how to surf and has been home to many of Spain's Champion surfers. Zarautz is one of the stops of the World Surf League's Qualifying Series.

Twin towns and sister cities
 Cardano al Campo, Italy
 Pontarlier, France
 El Hagounia, Western Sahara

See also
1980 Zarautz attack, an ETA attack which killed five people in the town.

References

External links
Official website 
Tourism in Zarautz
Village beaches website

Municipalities in Gipuzkoa
Tourism in Spain
Populated coastal places in Spain